I Am Not a Dog on a Chain is the thirteenth solo studio album by Morrissey, released through BMG on 20 March 2020. It is Morrissey's first album of original material since 2017's Low in High School. It was produced by Joe Chiccarelli, and lead single "Bobby, Don't You Think They Know?" features vocals from Thelma Houston.

Recording and promotion
The album was produced by Joe Chiccarelli and recorded at Studio La Fabrique in Saint-Rémy-de-Provence, France, as well as Sunset Sound in Hollywood.

In a press release, Morrissey called the album "the very best of me" and "too good to be true [...] too true to be considered good". Producer Joe Chiccarelli described it as Morrissey's "boldest and most adventurous album yet", claiming that he has "pushed the boundaries yet again – both musically and lyrically".

Critical reception

I Am Not a Dog on a Chain currently holds a score of 62 out of 100 - indicating "generally favourable" reviews - on review aggregator Metacritic, based on 13 reviews. Josh Modell of The A.V. Club gave the album a B− and felt that the lyrical content was the weakest but that Morrissey displayed songcraft and "a great vocal performance". The editorial staff of AllMusic gave the album 3.5 out of five stars, with reviewer Stephen Thomas Erlewine summing up his review by calling the album "one of the better latter-day Morrissey records" but decrying how "placid and complacent he's been for the better part of a decade". Mina Tavakoli of Pitchfork rated the album 6.1 out of 10 and called it "frequently ridiculous, mildly captivating, and occasionally repetitive, pocked by moments of goofiness that come from the runoff of a man eager to chase old miseries and find new ones to berate".

Writing for The Independent, Jake Cudsi rated the album two out of five stars, opining that it "has its moments, but they are brief and virtually lost amid the more experimental forays". Laura Snapes of The Guardian also gave the album two out of five stars, judging that Morrissey plays the "victim" and is "often lost among the strident music as he hectors people afraid to be themselves", though his "coyness undermines his apparent glee as a truth-teller". Associated Press wrote: "Morrissey delivers his best musical performance in years"

Track listing

Personnel
Morrissey – vocals (all tracks)

Additional musicians
Steve Aho – orchestration (track 6), conductor (track 6), contractor (track 6)
Boz Boorer – string arrangements (track 1), saxophone solo (track 3), acoustic guitar (trackd 4, 8, 11), electric guitar (track 7), mandolin (tracks 8, 9),  zither (track 9), clarinet (track 10)
Joe Chiccarelli – production, engineering, drum programming (tracks 1, 10, 11), additional synthesizer (track 10)
Daniel Cayotte – recitation (track 10)
Sally Chae – backing vocals (track 7)
Mike Daly – drum programming and synthesizer  (track 8)
Glendale Tab & Apple Choir – kids choir (track 11)
Thelma Houston – vocals (track 3)
Sean Hurley – bass guitar (track 5)
Victor Indrizzo – drums (track 5)
Greg Leisz – pedal steel guitar (track 5)
Danny Levin – trumpet (track 7)
Mando Lopez – bass guitar (tracks 1-4, 6-8, 10, 11), bass solo (track 8)
Roger Manning – harmonium (track 9), Mellotron (track 2), organ (track 9), piano (track 11), string and horn arrangements (track 6), synthesizer (tracks 1, 3-6, 8, 10, 11), backing vocals (tracks 5, 6, 11)
Gustavo Manzur – drum programming (track 2), nylon string guitar (track 2), Mellotron (track 11), piano (tracks 1, 3, 9), synthesizer (tracks 2, 6), backing vocals (track 2), accordion (track 10)
Karla Manzur – backing vocals (track 2)
Rose Mary – laughing (track 10)
David Ralicke – saxophone (track 3)
Bridget Regan – fiddle (track 8)
Megan Sluiter – laughing (track 10)
Jesse Tobias – acoustic guitars (tracks 5, 11), electric guitars (tracks 1-9, 11), recitation (track 10), electric sitar (track 1), guitar solo (track 6), cigar box guitar (track 10)
Matt Walker – drums (tracks 1-4, 6-11), percussion (tracks 3-7, 9, 11)

Technical personnel
John Fekner – photography
Miro La Gagioia – assistant engineering
Liam Lynch – artwork, design
Ken Sluiter – mixing
Chris Stewart – cover photo
Jose Vergara – photography
Emily Lazar – mastering engineering
Chris Allgood – assistant mastering engineering

Charts

See also
List of 2020 albums

References

External links

2020 albums
Albums produced by Joe Chiccarelli
BMG Rights Management albums
Morrissey albums